Christopher Brandon McCoy (born November 25, 1986) is a former gridiron football defensive end. He was drafted by the Miami Dolphins in the seventh round of the 2010 NFL Draft. He played college football at Middle Tennessee State. McCoy also played professional football for the Seattle Seahawks, Houston Texans, Pittsburgh Steelers, Philadelphia Eagles, and the Calgary Stampeders of the CFL.

Professional career

Miami Dolphins
McCoy was drafted by the Miami Dolphins with the 212th overall pick of the 2010 NFL Draft. On June 15, 2010, McCoy was signed to a four-year contract. He was waived during final cuts on September 4, but was re-signed to the team's practice squad. He was later released from the practice squad.

Seattle Seahawks
McCoy was signed to the Seattle Seahawks' practice squad on October 19, 2010. He was released on October 26, 2010.

Pittsburgh Steelers
McCoy played in all pre-season games of 2011 for the Pittsburgh Steelers but was cut from the final roster before the start of 2011 NFL season.

Calgary Stampeders
After being cut from the Steelers, McCoy signed with the Canadian Football League's Calgary Stampeders. McCoy played for the Stampeders as a defensive end and recorded 12 games with 29 tackles and five sacks over two seasons in the CFL.

Philadelphia Eagles
McCoy was signed by the Philadelphia Eagles on February 6, 2013 and was cut on August 31, 2013.

Jacksonville Jaguars
McCoy was claimed off waivers by the Jacksonville Jaguars on September 1, 2013 and released on September 14, 2013. He did not appear in any games.

He was signed to the team's practice squad on September 16, and later released on October 1.

External links
Middle Tennessee State Blue Raiders bio

References 

1986 births
Living people
People from Villa Rica, Georgia
Sportspeople from the Atlanta metropolitan area
Players of American football from Georgia (U.S. state)
American football linebackers
American football defensive ends
Middle Tennessee Blue Raiders football players
Miami Dolphins players
Seattle Seahawks players
Houston Texans players
Pittsburgh Steelers players
Philadelphia Eagles players
Jacksonville Jaguars players
American players of Canadian football
Canadian football linebackers
Calgary Stampeders players
Ottawa Redblacks players